So Pretty may refer to:

So Pretty (song), a 1968 song by Leonard Bernstein
So Pretty (album), a 2002 album by Kid Dakota, or the title song
So Pretty, a 1962 album by Herbie Steward
So Pretty, a 2004 EP by The Charms